The 1993 FA Cup final was contested by Arsenal and Sheffield Wednesday at Wembley. The original match, played on 15 May 1993, finished 1–1. Arsenal won the replay on 20 May, 2–1 after extra-time.

It was Arsenal's sixth FA Cup Final victory, and their first since the 1979 FA Cup Final. They became the first English side to achieve a domestic cup double, having also won the 1993 Football League Cup Final.

It was Sheffield Wednesday's first appearance in the FA Cup final since 1966. They also reached the League Cup final that season, also losing 2–1 to Arsenal (though without a replay). This appearance of the same two sides in the final of both of England's domestic knock-out tournaments in the same season had never happened before, and would be the only time until 2022. Sheffield Wednesday have not appeared in a domestic cup final since, reaching two League Cup semi-finals since then.

The replay is also notable as the last Arsenal appearance by veteran defender David O'Leary, who left shortly afterwards to join Leeds United, after an 18-year spell with Arsenal which had yielded 722 competitive games and six major trophies.

Match summary

Original match
Arsenal took the lead in the 20th minute, when Ian Wright headed in a cross. Sheffield Wednesday equalised in the 61st minute, when David Hirst turned in a low drive, past the advancing Arsenal goalkeeper, David Seaman.

Replay
The replay on a rainy Thursday night was a much better encounter. The kick-off for the replay was delayed by 30 minutes after an accident on the M1 motorway had delayed the arrival of most of Sheffield Wednesday's fans.

Once again, Ian Wright opened the scoring for Arsenal, running onto a through ball to prod the ball past Chris Woods, into the corner of the net. This was his fourth goal in FA Cup Finals at Wembley, just one behind the record-holder Ian Rush. Wednesday attacked Arsenal in the second half, and their persistence paid off when Chris Waddle's shot deflected off Arsenal defender Lee Dixon into the net.

The game went into extra time, and just when it seemed that the FA Cup Final would need to be decided on penalties, central defender Andy Linighan rose highest from a Paul Merson corner to head the ball goalwards. Goalkeeper Chris Woods fumbled and Graham Hyde could only help the ball into the top of the net. Linighan had played most of the game with a broken nose after Mark Bright had struck him in the face with his elbow and fittingly, it was Bright who Linighan outjumped in order to score.

Firsts and lasts
The matches were notable for several reasons; uniquely, the two clubs had already contested the season's League Cup Final, a match which Arsenal had won 2–1.

It was also dubbed the 'longest' FA Cup final. It had not only gone to extra-time in the replay – a match which was delayed by thirty minutes – but was just one minute away from the first ever FA Cup final penalty shoot-out. It was also the last FA Cup final to go to a replay; from 1999 onwards, it was decided that all FA Cup finals would be decided on the day.

This was the first FA Cup final in which squad numbers had been used, having been trialled in the League Cup final. Players from both clubs retained the same numbers for the three matches. The system was fully adopted by the Premier League for the following season.

Steve Morrow became the first player to receive a winner's medal before a cup final. He had scored the winning goal in the League Cup final, but suffered a broken arm in celebrations afterwards, and missed the subsequent presentation.

For Arsenal, David O'Leary played his last two official matches after joining the club as an apprentice in 1973. His testimonial took place between the final and the replay, on 17 May 1993. During extra-time in the replay Alan Smith received the only yellow card of his professional career.

In league matches between the two clubs that season, Arsenal won 2–1 at home on 29 August 1992, while Wednesday won their home fixture 1–0 on 6 May 1993.

Match details

Replay

References

External links
Line-ups

FA Cup Finals
FA Cup Final 1993
FA Cup Final 1993
Final
FA Cup Final 1993
FA Cup Final 1993